Chrysocoris patricius is a jewel bug in the family Scutelleridae. It is the smallest known species from the genus Chrysocoris.

Description
Adult has 9–11 mm long and 4–5 mm wide body. Shiny green body color with bluish reflection. Five segmented antennae, II segment is the shortest, I segment doesn't cross the head. Pronotum has 10 shiny black spots; 2 in the central line are larger and bolder. Scutellum has 8 bold spots, the central one is large and shield shaped surrounded by other smaller ones. Connexivum is pinkish. Legs are pubescent. Coxae and femurs (except apices) are brownish, apices of femurs and rest of the parts black. Ventral side of head is ochraceous. Sternums are black. Abdominal sternites are ochreous with black patches sideward. Center of III, IV and last abdominal sternites black.

Distribution
Nepal, India, Myanmar.

Host plants
Rice; Santalum album; Maize; Jatropha, Lucern, Sesamum indicum, Chickpea, Soybean, Fenugreek, Cowpea, Hollyhock, Potato, Cucurbits, Mint, Mango, Sorghum

References

Scutelleridae
Insects described in 1798